The Tewa Lodge is a historic motel on Central Avenue (former U.S. Route 66) in Albuquerque, New Mexico. It is notable as one of the best-preserved Route 66 era motels remaining in the city, and one of the few still operating as a motel. It was built in 1946 and was added to the New Mexico State Register of Cultural Properties and the National Register of Historic Places in 1998.

The motel consists of two buildings separated by a parking lot. The western building is one story and contains a single row of rooms opening onto the interior parking area. The eastern building has two rows of rooms back-to-back, with parking on either side, and has a two-story section at the front containing the office on the ground floor and manager's residence above. The building exemplifies Pueblo Revival architecture, with battered and buttressed stuccoed walls simulating adobe, flat roofs, and faux vigas. The motel has mostly original metal casement windows set in arched openings with wooden lintels. The design originally incorporated covered parking spaces between each pair of rooms, but these were later filled in to create additional rooms.

References

External links

Hotels in Albuquerque, New Mexico
Hotel buildings on the National Register of Historic Places in New Mexico
New Mexico State Register of Cultural Properties
National Register of Historic Places in Albuquerque, New Mexico
Hotel buildings completed in 1946
Motels in the United States
U.S. Route 66 in New Mexico
Pueblo Revival architecture in Albuquerque, New Mexico